The Immediate Geographic Region of Juiz de Fora is one of the 10 immediate geographic regions in the Intermediate Geographic Region of Juiz de Fora, one of the 70 immediate geographic regions in the Brazilian state of Minas Gerais and one of the 509 of Brazil, created by the National Institute of Geography and Statistics (IBGE) in 2017.

Municipalities 
It comprises 29 municipalities:

 Andrelândia
 Aracitaba
 Arantina
 Belmiro Braga
 Bias Fortes
 Bocaina de Minas
 Bom Jardim de Minas
 Chácara
 Chiador
 Coronel Pacheco
 Ewbank da Câmara
 Goianá
 Juiz de Fora
 Liberdade
 Lima Duarte
 Matias Barbosa
 Olaria
 Oliveira Fortes
 Paiva
 Passa Vinte
 Pedro Teixeira
 Piau
 Rio Novo
 Rio Preto
 Santa Bárbara do Monte Verde
 Santa Rita de Jacutinga
 Santana do Deserto
 Santos Dumont
 Simão Pereira

References 

Geography of Minas Gerais